Charles August Kading (January 14, 1874 – June 19, 1956) was a U.S. Representative from Wisconsin who represented Wisconsin's 2nd congressional district from 1927–1933.

Born in Lowell, Wisconsin, Kading was the son of Charles and Elizabeth Baggans Kading. He attended the country schools, Lowell Grade School, Horicon High School in Horicon, and the University of Wisconsin in Madison. He graduated from the law department of Valparaiso University in Valparaiso, Indiana, in 1900. He was admitted to the bar the same year and commenced practice in Watertown, Wisconsin. He was also interested in agricultural pursuits.

Kading served as city attorney of Watertown from 1905–1912, as district attorney for Dodge County from 1906–1912, and as mayor of Watertown from 1914–1916.

Kading was elected as a Republican to the Seventieth, Seventy-first, and Seventy-second Congresses, serving from March 4, 1927 – March 3, 1933. After being an unsuccessful candidate for renomination in 1932, he resumed the practice of law. He died in Watertown on June 19, 1956, and was interred in Oak Hill Cemetery there. His son, Charles E. Kading (1907–1992), also an attorney, served for many years as a judge in Jefferson County.

References

External links

History of Watertown, Wisconsin: Charles August Kading
Charles Kading at "The Political Graveyard"

1874 births
1956 deaths
People from Dodge County, Wisconsin
Politicians from Watertown, Wisconsin
Mayors of places in Wisconsin
Valparaiso University alumni
University of Wisconsin–Madison alumni
Republican Party members of the United States House of Representatives from Wisconsin